Rauvolfia caffra is a tree in the family Apocynaceae. It is commonly known as the quinine tree. These trees are distributed from the Eastern Cape of South Africa to tropical Africa and are found in low-lying forests near rivers and streams, or on floodplains.

Gallery

References

 Pooley, E. (1993). The Complete Field Guide to Trees of Natal, Zululand and Transkei. .

caffra
Quinine
Plants described in 1850
Flora of Africa
Taxa named by Otto Wilhelm Sonder